Françoise Laborde (born 8 July 1958) is a member of the Senate of France, representing the Haute Garonne département. She was a member of the Radical Party of the Left before rallying the Mouvement Radical Social Libéral party.

References
Page on the Senate website

External links
Official website

1958 births
Living people
People from Saint-Maur-des-Fossés
Politicians from Île-de-France
Radical Party of the Left politicians
La République En Marche! politicians
Radical Movement politicians
French Senators of the Fifth Republic
Senators of Haute-Garonne
Women members of the Senate (France)
21st-century French women politicians